Winnipeg into the '90s was an alliance of progressive and left-leaning municipal politicians in the city of Winnipeg, Manitoba, Canada.  It endorsed several candidates in the city's municipal elections of 1989, 1992 and 1995, including future mayor Glen Murray and future provincial Premier Greg Selinger.

"WIN" was formed to oppose the "Gang of 18", an informal group of right-wing municipal councillors who held a majority on council and met regularly before official council meetings to determine the city's agenda.  The "Gang of 18" was a successor to the Independent Citizens' Election Committee, a right-wing municipal party that dominated Winnipeg's city council from the early 1970s to the early 1980s.

Several WIN candidates were successful in the 1989 election, and the council was no longer under the control of any faction after the election.  WIN continued as a political organization in Winnipeg, under the name Winnipeg in the '90s.

References

Municipal government of Winnipeg
Political organizations based in Canada